Gaius Carrinas may refer to:
 Gaius Carrinas (praetor 82 BC), Roman general and politician
 Gaius Carrinas (consul 43 BC), Roman general and politician